Guangyi Station, is a metro station of Line 2, Wuxi Metro. It started operations on 28 December 2014.

Station Layout

Exits
There are 3 exits for this station.

References

Railway stations in Jiangsu
Wuxi Metro stations
Railway stations in China opened in 2014